Dedicated to the Ones We Love is the fifth studio album by the Australian folk rock group The Blackeyed Susans and was released on 23 April 2001. It is the first issued on their own label, Teardrop, and was distributed through Shock Records. As the name suggests, it is a collection of cover versions, focusing on songs that have influenced and inspired the band. It includes songs made popular by Frank Sinatra, Elvis Presley, The Crystals, Bob Dylan, The Velvet Underground, and, most poignantly, The Triffids. The Triffids were the previous band of David McComb, who had died in 1999 and was a founding member of The Blackeyed Susans. The album was well received by the public and lauded by the critics, a national tour followed keeping the band busy until the end of the year.

Background
Dedicated to the Ones We Love is a covers album by The Blackeyed Susans, focusing on songs that have influenced and inspired the band. In May 2000, the group parted ways with their record company Mds after it was bought by Festival Records. They had been working on their Shangri-La album since mid-1999 but this was postponed until 2002. In September–November 2000, the band recorded Dedicated to the Ones We Love at  Fortissimo Studios in South Melbourne. The band's pedal steel guitarist, Graham Lee produced alongside other band members.

On 23 April 2001, the album was released on their own label, Teardrop, and distributed through Shock Records. According to Shock Records, it paid tribute to the influences and aspirations of the band - including songs from Hollywood-period Elvis, epic Sinatra, and street level affirmations by Big Star and The Velvet Underground. It was well received by the public and lauded by the critics. A national tour followed keeping the band busy until the end of the year.

Phil Kakulas, the band's double bass guitarist, described the album, "My idea of going forward is actually going backwards. I like the idea of digging deep. That's why I really liked the covers album that we did". Rob Snarski, lead vocalist, chose "Everyone's Gone to the Moon" after hearing the Nina Simone version from her 1969 album, Nina Simone and Piano. Lisa Miller liked their version of "State Trooper" from Bruce Springsteen's 1982 release Nebraska. Snarski opined that if they were to do a second covers album, "Highway Patrolman" from the same album would be one of his choices – "What a great song about siblings, family, strength and loyalty". Ed Nimmervoll recommended the album, "Imagine Nick Cave trying to emulate Frank Sinatra and you're half-way towards an impression of the Blackeyed Susans' "style"". Other tracks include covers of The Crystals, Bob Dylan, The Velvet Underground, and, most poignantly, The Triffids. The Triffids were the previous band of David McComb, who had died in 1999 and was a founding member of The Blackeyed Susans.

Track listing 
All songs written by artists listed.

Personnel
According to The Blackeyed Susans:
 Rob Snarski – mainly vocals
 Dan Luscombe – mainly guitar and backing vocals
 Kiernan Box – mainly keyboards
 Phil Kakulas – mainly double bass
 Mark Dawson – mainly drums
 Matthew Habben – clarinet, saxophone
 Graham Lee – pedal steel, guitar
 Adam Hutterer – trombone
 Ken Gardner – trumpet

Notes

References

The Blackeyed Susans albums
2001 albums